Luahoko is an island in Tonga. It is located within the Ha'apai Group in the centre of the country, to northeast of the national capital of Nukualofa.

References

Islands of Tonga
Haʻapai